The Reid Park Zoo, founded in 1967, is a  city-owned and operated non-profit zoo located within Reid Park in Tucson, Arizona. The zoo features more than 500 animals. It was unofficially established in 1965 by Gene Reid, the parks and recreation director at the time.

Exhibits

Reid Park Zoo consists of four zones that are organized by the types of habitats and animals they house. The Adaptation Zone houses animals such as the grizzly bear and Aldabra giant tortoise, the South America zone houses animals such as the jaguar and spectacled bear, the Asian zone features the tiger, and the African Animals zone features animals such as the lion and giraffe. The African Animals zone also houses a 7-acre expansion (Expedition Tanzania) which was opened to the public in 2012. A large aviary named Flight Connection hosts dozens of species of birds from Australia, Africa, and Asia.

Expedition Tanzania 
Expedition Tanzania is currently home to an all-female herd of 4 African elephants, Semba (the matriarch), Lungile (an unrelated female who is also an "allomother"), Nandi (daughter of Mabu and Semba, the first ever elephant to be born in the State of Arizona on August 20, 2014) and Penzi (daughter of Mabu and Semba, born on April 6, 2020).

History
1965: A fledgling zoo was started by Gene Reid, then Parks & Recreation director, with exhibits of pheasants, peafowl, and guinea fowl just north of the present zoo site.

1966: Prairie dogs from Lubbock, Texas, were exhibited in “Prairie Dog Town” in the former “overlook” at Randolph Park.  A 1.5 acre “collection of animals” become known as the “Randolph Park Children’s Zoo”.  The first purchase of an “exotic” animal was made in the fall:  a two-year-old male Asian elephant.

1967-1968: The first budget of $49,000 presented to and approved by Tucson City Council, effectively opening the zoo and making it part of city operations.  New animal additions included alligator, bear, camel, leopard, primates, and tapir.  The zoo’s name was changed to Randolph Park Zoo.  A group called Friends of Gene Reid was informally organized to assist with everyday operations.

1972: Admission fees were instituted.  J.L. Swigert became the zoo’s first professional administrator.  Michael Flint was hired as the zoo’s first curator.  The zoo was admitted to the Association of Zoos & Aquariums (then known as American Association of Zoos & Aquariums).

1973: The leopard exhibit was built with money collected at the admission gate.

1974: The now former elephant exhibit was built.

1975: The polar bear exhibit was built.  Dr. Ivo Poglayen became the second zoo administrator.  A combination entrance/gift shop was constructed on the south border of the zoo.

1976: The rhino exhibit was built, and Macaw Island was constructed.  Friends of Gene Reid became Friends of Randolph Zoo Society, Inc.

1977: The African Veldt (zebra/ostrich area) exhibit was built and animals were purchased for it.  The first and second classes of docents (volunteers) were organized and trained.

1978: The Asian Grasslands exhibit was constructed and opened.  The zoo’s size expanded to 15 acres with the purchase of 2 acres on the east side.  The zoo’s name was changed to Reid Park Zoo when the park’s name changed. Friends of Randolph Zoo Society, Inc. was incorporated as the Tucson Zoological Society.

1979: The health center and administration offices were constructed and opened.

1981: An entrance, gift shop, and snack bar were constructed at the north end of the zoo.  The zoo’s size increased to 17 acres with acquisition of more land.

1982: The current snack bar was built and became operational.  The waterfowl exhibit was constructed and opened in September.  The former entrance/gift shop   building on the south side of the zoo was remodeled into the zoo school and docent headquarters.

1983: The lion exhibit was constructed and opened in August.

1985: The tiger exhibit constructed and opened in September.

1986: Steve McCusker became the third administrator in October.

1987: The Malayan sun bear exhibit was constructed and opened in March. Kerry Hoffman became the first education curator.

1988: Remodeling of the lion-tailed macaque enclosure was completed and the enclosure was occupied in May.  Construction was completed on the new zoo administration building in July.  Construction began on the new giraffe exhibit and the remodeling of the polar bear enclosure.  The demolition of old cat and bear cages was completed.

1990: The giraffe and polar bear exhibits were completed.  Initial plans for the new South America Exhibit were drawn up by architects.  The first executive director for TZS was hired in August.

1991: Susan Basford became the second education curator in January.  The mandrill exhibit was remodeled.

1992: The former Asian Grassland area was converted into the new African Savanna, and new African species were introduced.  The first “Festival of Lights” event was held.

1993: Extensive remodeling of the zoo school was completed.  The first “ZOOcson” fundraiser event was held.

1994: Remodeling of the alligator exhibit began in March for a new caiman habitat.

1995: Susan Basford became the fourth administrator.  Construction of the South America exhibit began.

1996: Vivian VanPeenen became the third education curator. The first “Howl-o-ween” event was held.

1997: The South America Exhibit was completed.

1999: The Flight Connection Aviary opened in December.

2000: The lion-tail macaque exhibit was remodeled.

2003: The polar bear exhibit was expanded to include a natural substrate yard. New front gate project was completed.

2004: Scott Barton became the zoo’s second general curator.

2006: The giraffe feeding platform is completed.

2007: Kenya Get Wet splash pad opens.

2008: Completion of the Lee H. Brown Family Conservation Learning Center. Lion tailed macaque exhibit was remodeled.

2009: Jim Schnormeier becomes the third general curator.  The Zoofari Café is remodeled and includes indoor seating for first time.

2010: The Gift Shop is remodeled. Groundbreaking for the Expedition Tanzania expansion takes place.

2012: Expedition Tanzania, the new elephant exhibit, opens in April.

2013: Jason Jacobs is named as the zoo’s fifth administrator. The polar bear and mandrill exhibits are remodeled to house grizzly bears and black-and-white lemurs respectively.

2014: A female African elephant calf was born in August, the first ever born in the State of Arizona.

2015: Hosted Bear TAG conference. Wildlife Carousel opened. Baird's tapir born.

2018: Zoo management changed from City of Tucson to Reid Park Zoological Society. New Animal Health Center opened.

2019: Temple of the Tiny Monkeys, a new squirrel monkey habitat, opened in April. Jaguar habitat improved.

Asia
 White-handed gibbon
 Malayan tiger

South America
 Spectacled bear
 Baird's tapir
 Black-necked swan
 Capybara
 Crested screamer
 Galapagos tortoise
 Giant anteater
 Greater rhea
 Jaguar
 Pacu
 Squirrel monkey
 Yellow-spotted Amazon river turtle

South American Aviary
 Blue-crowned motmot
 Boat-billed heron
 King vulture
 Ringed teal
 Roseate spoonbill
 Saffron finch
 Scarlet ibis
 Silver-beaked tanager
 Troupial
 White-faced whistling duck
 Wood duck
 Yellow-knobbed curassow

Africa
 African crowned crane
 African elephant
 African lion
 Black-and-white ruffed lemur
 Common ostrich
 Domestic goat
 Grevy’s zebra
 Leopard tortoise
 Meerkat
 Reticulated giraffe
 Southern white rhinoceros
 Speke's gazelle
 Spotted-necked otter

Adaption Zone
 Aldabra giant tortoise
 Chilean flamingo
 Grizzly bear
 Lion-tailed macaque

Flight Connection Aviary
 Bald ibis
 Bearded barbet
 Black crake
 Blue-billed  teal (Anas hottentota)
 Bruce's green pigeon
 Cape thick-knee
 Golden-breasted starling
 Great argus
 Great Indian hornbill
 Luzon bleeding-heart
 Marbled teal
 Nicobar pigeon
 Red-whiskered bulbul
 Sulfur-crested cockatoo
 Taveta golden weaver
 Trumpeter hornbill
 Violet turaco
 White-cheeked turaco
 White-rumped shama

Conservation Learning Center
 Bearded dragon
 Blessed poison frog
 Brazilian cockroach
 Golden poison frog
 Green tree python
 Strawberry poison frog
 Yellow-headed poison frog
 Splash-back poison frog

Medical facilities 
Reid Park Zoo has the unique ability to treat animals with cancer using radiation therapy and heat therapy. Through a partnership with the University of Arizona Cancer Center, radiation oncologists can treat animals, such as a Galapagos tortoise in 1983, that are transported to the zoo from all over the country.

Effects of activism 
Early in 2006, a group of local activists named Save Tucson Elephants lobbied the city to move Reid Park Zoo's two elephants, Connie and Shaba, to a sanctuary in Tennessee. However, the city council decided instead to raise funds to build a new elephant enclosure, after receiving public petitions to keep the elephants in Tucson.

References

External links
 

Zoos in Arizona
Culture of Tucson, Arizona
Buildings and structures in Tucson, Arizona
Tourist attractions in Tucson, Arizona
Parks in Pima County, Arizona
Zoos established in 1965